Chetrosu may refer to:

Chetrosu, a village in Gherghești Commune, Vaslui County, Romania
Chetrosu, Anenii Noi, a commune in Anenii Noi district, Moldova
Chetrosu, Drochia, a commune in Drochia district, Moldova